Mamudpur  is a village in Chanditala I community development block of Srirampore subdivision in Hooghly district in the Indian state of West Bengal.

Geography

Gram panchayat
Villages in Haripur gram panchayat are: Anantarampur, Bade Sola, Baghati, Ban Panchbere, Chak Bangla, Chota Choughara, Dudhkomra, Haripur, Ichhapasar, Jagmohanpur, Mamudpur and Radhaballabhpur.

Demographics
As per 2011 Census of India, Mamudpur had a total population of 1,522 of which 731 (48%) were males and 791 (52%) were females. Population below 6 years was 172. The total number of literates in Mamudpur was 1,159 (85.85% of the population over 6 years).

References 

Villages in Chanditala I CD Block